Beit 'Amra is a Palestinian village located twelve kilometers southwest of Hebron. The village is in the Hebron Governorate Southern West Bank. According to the Palestinian Central Bureau of Statistics, the village had a population of 2,165 in 2007.

History

Ancient period 
Beit 'Amra is believed to be identical with Beit 'Amar, a site mentioned in a document dating from the second century CE, in which a Jewish widow declared her rights fulfilled. The document, written in Hebrew and Aramaic on papyrus and said to be signed at Beit 'Amar, also mentions two other villages in the southern Hebron Hills: Aristobolia and Upper Anab. The document is self-dated to the "year four of the destruction of the House of Israel", which scholars believe refers to 4th year after the suppression of the Bar Kokhba revolt, thus dating the document to circa 140 CE. This document indicates that Jews remained in the southern Hebron Hills in the aftermath of the revolt.

Potsherds from the early Roman period were found at Khirbet Beit 'Amra.

Ottoman period 
French explorer Victor Guérin visited the place in 1863, which he described as a ruin. He noted that "these ruins extend over a large hill, whose lower parts are provided with sustaining walls. A good many cisterns are cut in the sides of the hill. Several of these are provided with the stones intended to stop the orifice. On all sides are to be seen old subterranean magazines, once belonging to houses now destroyed, the ruins of which are covered with brushwood. The vestiges of two churches, almost completely destroyed, are still visible. They are both built east and west; one occupied the higher part of the village, the other the lower. On the site of the first, among other things, are the fragments of a baptismal font."

In 1883, the PEF's Survey of Western Palestine found it to be a "ruined site on a hill, resembling Khurbet 'Aziz in character. Cisterns, ruined walls, shafts of pillars, and lintel stones were observed".

British Era 
Control of the village passed to the British after they defeated the Ottoman Empire in World War 1. The area was administered until 1948 as the British Mandate for Palestine.

Jordanian Era
In the wake of the 1948 Arab–Israeli War, and after the 1949 Armistice Agreements, Beit 'Amra came  under Jordanian rule.

The Jordanian census of 1961 found 119 inhabitants in Beit 'Amra.

Post-1967 
Since the Six-Day War in 1967, Beit 'Amra has been under Israeli occupation.

Footnotes

Bibliography

External links
Welcome To Kh. Bayt Amra
 Beit ‘Amra, Welcome to Palestine
Survey of Western Palestine, Map 21:  IAA, Wikimedia commons
 Beit 'Amra Village (Fact Sheet), Applied Research Institute–Jerusalem, ARIJ
Beit 'Amra Village Profile, ARIJ
 Beit 'Amra Village Area Photo, ARIJ
 The priorities and needs for development in Beit 'Amra village based on the community and local authorities’ assessment, ARIJ

Villages in the West Bank
Hebron Governorate
Municipalities of the State of Palestine